Kristina Maria Gjerde is a High Seas Policy Advisor for the International Union for Conservation of Nature Global Marine and Polar Program. She works on the Global Ocean Biodiversity Initiative and won the 2018 Boat International Visionary Ocean Award.  Gjerde currently lives in the greater Boston area.

Education and early career 
Gjerde studied history at University of California, Los Angeles. She graduated summa cum laude in 1981. She moved to the east coast and studied law at New York University, graduating Juris Doctor in 1984. She worked on the use of space technology in conflict prevention as an intern at the United Nations. She specialised in admiralty law at Lord Day & Lord. She was not allowed to join the admiralty law social club, the Whitehall Club, as it did not accept women members. During a scuba diving trip to Palau, Gjerde became interested in protecting the oceans. She was awarded a two-year fellowship at Woods Hole Oceanographic Institution in 1988. She evaluated the international protection that was given to Caribbean coral reefs. This report made her realise that it was possible to force constructive change through analysis and negotiation. She greatly admired Elisabeth Mann Borgese. She joined the University of Hull as a research fellow and lecturer. She has represented the World Wide Fund for Nature at the International Maritime Organization since 1993.

Career 
Since 2002, Gjerde has served as High Seas Policy Advisor for the International Union for Conservation of Nature. At the International Union for Conservation of Nature Gjerde is responsible for helping communities and governments protect the environment.  In 2003, Gjerde was awarded a Pew Foundation fellowship in marine conservation to promote improved legal regimes for oceans that were beyond the jurisdiction of nations. She was elected as New York University School of Law's alumna of the month in 2004. She worked on ways to protect deep-sea coral ecosystems.  Gjerde delivered a TED talk, Making law on the high seas, in 2014. Since 2015, Gjerde has been a member of the Cambridge Conservation Agenda for Biodiversity Beyond National Jurisdiction and the EU project Managing Impacts of Deep Sea Resource Exploitation (MIDAS). She is an adjunct professor at the Middlebury Institute of International Studies at Monterey, teaching the Masters program on International Environmental Policy. She is interested in how we can use law, science, technology and economics to manage global oceans. She was made an honorary fellow at the University of Edinburgh in 2016. She actively participates in the Biodiversity Beyond National Jurisdictions negotiations at the United Nations and the negotiations on deep sea mining regulations at the International Seabed Authority.

Gjerde has delivered several keynote talks on ocean conservation. She co-founded and helped to lead the Deep Ocean Stewardship Initiative, the Deep Sea Conservation Coalition, the High Seas Alliance, the Global Ocean Biodiversity Initiative and the Sargasso Sea Project.

Deep Sea Conservation Coalition 
The Deep Sea Conservation Coalition (founded 2004) work to address to issue of bottom trawling in high seas, which has harmful impacts on the environment. They look to reduce the greatest threats to life and safeguard the health of deep-sea ecosystems.

Global Ocean Biodiversity Initiative 
The Global Ocean Biodiversity Initiative (founded 2008) is an international partnership that supports conservation of biological diversity in the deep sea and open ocean. They develop data, tools and methods to identify ocean areas in need of special care. She supports this with the German Federal Agency for Nature Conservation. They found that female northern elephant seals swim halfway across the pacific to find areas to feed. They identified where white sharks congregate in the northeastern Pacific. She was involved with the 2018 celebrations for the ten-year anniversary of the initiatives.

Sargasso Sea Alliance 
The Sargasso Sea Alliance (founded 2010) looks to protect the health and productivity of the Sargasso Sea. It looks to serve as a model for ways to achieve protective status for areas beyond national jurisdiction. She published Lessons from the Sargasso Sea in 2016. In 2016 the Northwest Atlantic Fisheries Organization closed the Corner Rise Seamounts and New England Seamounts to bottom fishing.

High Seas Alliance 
The High Seas Alliance (founded 2011) is a partnership of organisation that conserve the high seas through international cooperation and governance. They work with global leaders, non-governmental members and the International Union for Conservation of Nature.

Deep Ocean Stewardship Initiative 
The Deep-Ocean Stewardship Initiative (founded 2013) use stake-holder workshops, publications and surveys to engage experts in law, policy, economics and conservation. They work with national and global policymakers, as well as educators and civilians.

Gjerde won the 2018 Boat International Media Visionary Ocean Award.

Publications 
Gjerde has published in many journals including the Journal of Marine and Coastal Law, the Ocean Yearbook, and Science.

Family 
Gjerde was born in 1957 and is the daughter of Hildegard Huntsman and Marion Wilbur Gjerde. She is married to Adam de Sola Pool and has a son.

References 

Women oceanographers
University of California, Los Angeles alumni
New York University alumni
Admiralty law
People from California
American women lawyers
American lawyers
American women scientists